Srikanth Deva is an Indian music director of Tamil films. He made his debut as music director in the Tamil movie Doubles in 2000. He is the son of composer Deva, nephew of the famous music director duo Sabesh–Murali and the cousin of actor Jai.

Personal life
Srikanth married Febi Mani on 21 February 2005 at Chennai. Their first daughter Varanya, was born in 2007.

Discography

Released projects

Upcoming projects

Singer
"Mummy Chellama" (Jore)
 "Aasaiyilla" (Kathavarayan)
 "Azhagazhaghai" (Madhikettan Saalai)
 "Coimbatore Coimbatore" (Githan)
 "Kadhal Kirukka" (Kadhal Kirukkan)
 "Kaalaiyum Neeye", "Nyokka Makka" (Madurai Veeran)
 "Love in minor" (Nepali)
 "Machaan" (Machaan)
 "Mayile Mayile" (Aalwar)
 "Miya Miya" (Aai)
 "Naan Tholaithuvitten" (Ivanum Panakkaran)
 "Pachaikili", "Pottuthakku" (Kuthu)
 "Sudamani" (Ragalaipuram)
 "Topclass" (Puli Vesham)

Filmography

References

https://www.imdb.com/name/nm1921858

Tamil film score composers
Living people
Tamil Nadu State Film Awards winners
Tamil playback singers
1980 births